Lê Kính Tông (chữ Hán: 黎敬宗, 1588 – 23 June 1619), also called Lê Duy Tân (黎維新) was the 16th emperor of Vietnamese Later Lê dynasty reigning from 1599 to 1619. He acted as a figurehead monarch while Lord Trịnh Tùng took full authority over the government and the army. In 1619, Kính Tông cooperated with Trịnh Xuân to make a plot to remove Trịnh Tùng from power. The plot failed and the emperor was killed.

References

1588 births
1619 deaths
Lê dynasty emperors
16th-century Vietnamese monarchs
17th-century Vietnamese monarchs
17th-century murdered monarchs
Vietnamese monarchs